The 1862–63 United States Senate elections were held on various dates in various states, occurring during the American Civil War. As these U.S. Senate elections were prior to the ratification of the Seventeenth Amendment in 1913, senators were chosen by state legislatures. Senators were elected over a wide range of time throughout 1862 and 1863, and a seat may have been filled months late or remained vacant due to legislative deadlock. In these elections, terms were up for the senators in Class 1.

Since many Southern states seceded in 1860 and 1861, six senators resigned to join the Confederacy, and 14 were expelled for supporting the rebellion: these seats were declared vacant. To establish a quorum with fewer members, a lower total seat number was taken into account.

The Republican Party increased their control of the Senate by gaining three seats, bringing their majority to two-thirds of the body. Also caucusing with them were Unionists and Unconditional Unionists, giving them a commanding majority.

Results summary 
Senate party division, 38th Congress (1863–1865)

 Majority party: Republican (31), later rose to 33
 Minority party: Democratic (10)
 Other parties: Unionist (4), later dropped to 3; Unconditional Unionist (3), later rose to 4
 Vacant: 20, later rose to 22
 Total seats: 48, later rose to 50

Change in composition

Before the elections 
At the beginning of 1862.

As a result of the elections

Beginning of the next Congress

Race summaries

Elections during the 37th Congress 
In these elections, the winners were seated during 1862 or in 1863 before March 4; ordered by election date.

Elections leading to the 38th Congress 
In these regular elections, the winners were elected for the term beginning March 4, 1863; ordered by state.

All of the elections involved the Class 1 seats.

Elections during the 38th Congress 
In these elections, the winners were elected in 1863 after March 4; ordered by election date.

California

Connecticut

Delaware

Florida

Illinois (special) 

Republican appointee Orville Browning, who had been appointed in June 1861 on the death of Stephen A. Douglas, retired instead of running to finish the class 2 term.

Democrat William Richardson won the January 12, 1863 special election over Governor of Illinois Richard Yates.

Richardson would lose renomination in the 1865 election to the next term, which Yates would win.

Indiana

Indiana (special) 

Democratic incumbent Jesse D. Bright was expelled from the Senate February 5, 1862 for supporting the Confederacy.

The governor appointed Unionist former-Governor Joseph A. Wright February 24, 1862, until a successor could be elected to finish the term.

Democrat David Turpie was elected to finish the term, ending March 3, 1863.

Turpie was not a candidate for the next term, however.

Indiana (regular) 

Former United States Representante Thomas A. Hendricks, who had not been a candidate to finish the current term, was elected in 1862 to the next term, starting March 4, 1863.

Maine 

First-term Republican Lot M. Morrill was elected to his first full term January 13, 1863.

Maryland 

Reverdy Johnson won election by an unknown margin of votes, for the Class 1 seat.

Massachusetts 

Two-term Republican Charles Sumner was re-elected.

Sumner would be re-elected again in 1869 and serve until his death in 1874.

Michigan

Michigan (special)

Michigan (regular)

Minnesota 

Minnesota's U.S. Senate election was held January 14, 1863 by the state legislature in a joint convention. Alexander Ramsey was a former Whig U.S. Representative from Pennsylvania's 14th Congressional District (1843-1847), former Minnesota Territorial Governor (1849-1853), former Mayor of St. Paul (1855), and sitting Minnesota Governor (1860-1863). Ramsey's main challengers for the Republican nomination were Cyrus Aldrich, David Cooper, and James Smith during balloting on January 12, 1863. Andrew G. Chatfield was a former New York state legislator and Associate Justice of the Minnesota Territorial Supreme Court (1849-1858).

Mississippi

Missouri

Missouri (regular) 

Democrat Trusten Polk was expelled January 10, 1862 from the Class 1 seat for supporting the rebellion.  Unionist (and later Unconditional Unionist) John B. Henderson was appointed January 17, 1862 to finish the term.

Henderson was elected to the next term in 1863.

Missouri (special) 

Democrat Waldo P. Johnson was expelled January 10, 1862 from the Class 3 seat for supporting the rebellion.  Unionist (and later Unconditional Unionist) Robert Wilson was appointed January 17, 1862 to continue the term, pending a special election.

Fellow Unconditional Unionist Benjamin Gratz Brown was elected and would align with the Radical Republicans.  He would retire at the end of his term in 1867 due to ill health.

New Jersey 

In both elections, the New Jersey legislature elected its senators in joint convention.

New Jersey (special) 

Elected January 14, 1863

Wall was not elected to the next term, so he only served for less than two months.

New Jersey (regular) 

Former senator William Wright was elected February 26, 1863.

Wright would serve until his death in 1866.

New York 

The New York election was held February 3, 1863 by the New York State Legislature.

Republican Preston King had been elected in February 1857 to this seat, and his term would expire on March 3, 1863.

At the State election in November 1861, 22 Republicans and 10 Democrats were elected for a two-year term (1862–1863) in the state senate. At the state election in November 1862, Democrat Horatio Seymour was elected governor; and a tied Assembly of 64 Republicans and Democrats each was elected for the session of 1863. In December, in the 15th Senate District, Republican William Clark was elected for the session of 1863 to fill the vacancy caused by the death of Democrat John Willard. The 86th New York State Legislature met from January 6 to April 25, 1863, at Albany, New York.

The election of a Speaker proved to be difficult in the stalemated Assembly. The Democrats voted for Gilbert Dean, the Republicans for Henry Sherwood, of Steuben Co. The Republicans, led by Chauncey M. Depew, became worried about the U.S. Senate election, due to occur on the first Tuesday in February. If the Assembly was not organized by then, the seat would become vacant, and could remain so until the next elected Assembly met in 1864. The Republicans, with a majority of 14 on joint ballot, were anxious to fill the seat, to have a maximum of support for President Abraham Lincoln in the U.S. Senate during the ongoing American Civil War. Theophilus C. Callicot, a Democratic assemblyman from Brooklyn, approached Depew to propose a deal: the Republicans should vote for Callicot as Speaker, and Callicot would help to elect the Republican candidate to the U.S. Senate. Depew put the proposition before the Republican caucus, and they accepted. On January 16, Sherwood and Dean withdrew. The Republicans then voted for Callicot, the Democrats for Eliphaz Trimmer, of Monroe Co. The Democrats, whose intention it was to prevent the election of a U.S. Senator, managed to postpone the vote for Speaker by filibustering for another ten days, but on January 26, Callicot was elected Speaker on the 92nd ballot (vote: Callicot 61, Trimmer 59, 3 Democrats were absent and 3 Republicans were paired). Thus the Assembly was organized to begin the session of 1863, three weeks late but in time for the U.S. Senate election.

The caucus of Republican State legislators met on February 2, State Senator Alexander H. Bailey presided. They nominated Ex-Governor Edwin D. Morgan (in office 1859–1862) for the U.S. Senate. The incumbent senator Preston King was voted down.

The caucus of the Democratic State legislators met on the evening of February 2, State Senator John V. L. Pruyn presided. They did not nominate any candidate, instead adopting a resolution that "each Democratic member of the Legislature be requested to name for that office such person as he deems proper." They met again on the morning of February 3, and nominated Congressman Erastus Corning. The vote in an informal ballot stood: 28 for Corning, 21 for Fernando Wood, and 18 scattering. Wood's name was however withdrawn and Cornings nomination was made unanimous.

In the Assembly, Edwin D. Morgan received the votes of the 64 Republicans, and Erastus Corning the votes of 62 Democrats. Bernard Hughes (Dem.), of New York City, voted for Ex-Mayor of New York Fernando Wood, and Speaker Callicot voted for John Adams Dix. Thus the vote was tied, and no choice made. Speaker Callicot, although elected by the Republicans, refused to vote for the Republican caucus nominee, insisting in his vote for Dix who had been U.S. Senator and U.S. Secretary of the Treasury as a Democrat, but was now a Union general in the Civil War. A second ballot was then taken, and the Republicans took Callicot's hint, and voted for Dix who was nominated by the Assembly. Thus Callicot kept his part of the bargain, knowing that, on joint ballot, the Republican state senate majority will outvote the Democrats, and elect their candidate. It was just necessary that the Assembly nominate somebody, so that it became possible to proceed to a joint ballot.

In the state senate, Edwin D. Morgan was nominated.

Both houses of the legislature then proceeded to a joint ballot.

Edwin D. Morgan was declared elected after a joint ballot of the state legislature.

Ohio

Oregon (special)

Pennsylvania 

The Pennsylvania election was held January 13, 1863. Charles Buckalew was elected by the Pennsylvania General Assembly to the United States Senate.

The Pennsylvania General Assembly convened on January 13, 1863, to elect a senator as follows:

|-
|-bgcolor="#EEEEEE"
| colspan=3 align="right" | Totals
| align="right" | 133
| align="right" | 100.00%
|}

Rhode Island 

Two-term (once in the 1840s and again until 1863) Republican James F. Simmons resigned August 15, 1862 as the Senate was preparing to expel him for bribery.

Rhode Island (special) 

Republican Lieutenant Governor of Rhode Island Samuel G. Arnold was elected September 5, 1862 to finish Simmons's term.

Rhode Island (regular) 

Republican Governor of Rhode Island William Sprague IV was elected to the next term.

Tennessee

Texas

Vermont

Virginia

Wisconsin

West Virginia 

There were two races for the new state.

Peter G. Van Winkle and Waitman T. Willey, both Unconditional Unionists, were elected August 4, 1863.

Van Winkle would serve just until the 1869 end of his term.

Before being elected senator from West Virginia, Willey was a senator from Virginia representing the Restored Government of Virginia, presenting their petition to Congress for West Virginia's statehood.  He would be re-elected in 1865 to the next term served until the end of that term in 1871.

See also
 1862 United States elections
 1862–63 United States House of Representatives elections
 37th United States Congress
 38th United States Congress

Notes

References

Sources and external links 
 
 , see pg. 568 for U. S. Senators; pg. 443 for state senators 1863; pg. 496ff for Members of Assembly 1863
  
 Result state election 1861 in The Tribune Almanac for 1862 compiled by Horace Greeley of the New York Tribune
 Result state election 1862 in The Tribune Almanac for 1863 compiled by Horace Greeley of the New York Tribune
 Important from Albany – Nomination of Ex-Governor Morgan for United States Senator by the Union Caucus. The Democrats Decline to Make a Nomination in The New York Times on February 3, 1863
 Proceedings of the Legislature; Senate... The Adjourned Democratic Caucus in The New York Times on February 4, 1863
 Important from Albany – Ex-Governor Morgan Elected U.S. Senator in The New York Times on February 4, 1863
 Result in the Senate: Journal of the Senate (86th Session) (1863; pg. 95f)
 Result in the Assembly: Journal of the Assembly (86th Session) (1863; pg. 151f and 154)
 Pennsylvania Election Statistics: 1682-2006 from the Wilkes University Election Statistics Project